A. Harmsworth Glacier or Alfred Harmsworth Glacier is a glacier in northern Greenland. Administratively it belongs to the Northeast Greenland National Park.

The glacier was named by Robert Peary after British newspaper magnate Alfred Harmsworth, who had gifted him expedition ship "Windward" following a lecture on Polar exploration Peary gave at the Royal Geographical Society in 1897.

Geography 
The A. Harmsworth Glacier is flowing roughly to the NW and has its terminus at the head of the Benedict Fjord. It fills most of the inner fjord. Gertrud Rask Land lies on its eastern side and Roosevelt Land in the west.

The peaks of the Roosevelt Range rise on both sides and at the head of the A. Harmsworth Glacier. To the east some peaks rise to heights above . The A. Harmsworth Glacier is one of the large glaciers in the area.

See also
List of glaciers in Greenland
Peary Land

References

External links
 83° 35' 56" N 36° 47' 32" W Fjord Gletcher. The northernmost calving glacier
Glaciers of Greenland
Roosevelt Range